Al-Quṣaybah is a sub-district located in the At-Ta'iziyah District, Taiz Governorate, Yemen. Al-Quṣaybah had a population of 2,293 according to the 2004 census.

References  

Sub-districts in At-Ta'iziyah District